Daksa is a small uninhabited island in the Croatian part of the Adriatic Sea. It is situated near Dubrovnik in front of the Rijeka Dubrovačka ria.

The Daksa's Franciscan monastery was built in 1281. The island was the site of the Daksa massacre by Yugoslav partisans entering Dubrovnik in late October 1944. Mayor of Dubrovnik Niko Koprivica was among those executed. In September 2009, authorities discovered the remains of six victims in the area. Soon after, the Daksa 1944/45 Association announced that 48 bodies had been discovered on the island.

The president of the Croatian Helsinki Committee Ivo Banac called for an investigation into what exactly occurred during the massacre. Members of the Croatian Bishops' Conference visited the site in October 2009.

See also
Petar Perica
Jakljan

References

Islets of Croatia
Islands of the Adriatic Sea
Uninhabited islands of Croatia
Elaphiti Islands